Obren Čučković (born 2 May 1983) is a Serbian former football goalkeeper.

Career
Born in Bač, Čuković played for OFK Bačka and Dinamo Pančevo before he went abroad. He joined Young Africans from Tanzania in the summer of 2008 and stayed with the club until 2011. Later he was with Azam, and after that he moved to Vietnam, in Ho Chi Minh City. Next he was with Mladost Podgorica in Montenegro for the 2012–13 season, before he moved back to Africa in 2014. After episodes with Blackburn Rovers, and Moroka Swallows in South Africa, he returned to OFK Bačka in the summer of 2015.

References

External links
 
 

1983 births
Living people
Association football goalkeepers
Serbian footballers
OFK Bačka players
FK Dinamo Pančevo players
Serbian expatriate footballers
Serbian expatriate sportspeople in Tanzania
Serbian expatriate sportspeople in Vietnam
Serbian expatriate sportspeople in Montenegro
Serbian expatriate sportspeople in South Africa
Serbian expatriate sportspeople in Sweden
Expatriate footballers in Tanzania
Expatriate footballers in Vietnam
Expatriate footballers in Montenegro
Expatriate soccer players in South Africa
Expatriate footballers in Sweden
Young Africans S.C. players
OFK Titograd players
Montenegrin First League players
Azam F.C. players
Moroka Swallows F.C. players
Tanzanian Premier League players
People from Bač, Serbia